The Purnach is a right tributary to the river Ponoy on the Kola Peninsula, Russia. The Purnach runs to the south of and roughly parallel to the Ponoy. The confluence of the two rivers is 77 km upstream from where the Ponoy flows into the White Sea.

References

Rivers of Murmansk Oblast
Tributaries of the Ponoy